Central Makira is a single-member constituency of the National Parliament of Solomon Islands. Created in 1993 when Parliament was expanded from 38 to 47 seats, it is located on the island of Makira.

List of MPs

Election results

2019

2014

2010

2006

2001

1997

1993

References

Solomon Islands parliamentary constituencies
1993 establishments in the Solomon Islands
Constituencies established in 1993